Don't Wait may refer to:

Music

Albums
Don't Wait (album), a 2006 album by Adie

Songs
"Don't Wait" (Dashboard Confessional song), 2006
"Don't Wait", song by J.J. Cale from 1982 album Grasshopper
"Don't Wait", song by Mapei
"Don't Wait", song by Hit the Lights Skip School, Start Fights
"Don't Wait", song by Boxer (band) Patto, Halsall	1976
"Don't Wait", song by Johnnie Taylor Ija' Sun Perri	1983
"Don't Wait", song by Noiseworks J. Stevens, J. Stanley, S. Fraser	1986
"Don't Wait", song by Dala from Who Do You Think You Are, 2007
"Don't Wait", song by The Duke Spirit	2011

"Don't Wait" (Joey Graceffa song), a 2015 song by Joey Graceffa